AS Type A2 is a light car made from 1924 until 1926 by Voiturettes Automobiles A.S. initially at Courbevoie, and subsequently relocated to La Garenne-Colombes where they operated till 1928.

History and specifications 
The manufacturer took at stand at the 19th Paris Motor Show in October 1924 and exhibited a small attractive 2-seater "Torpedo" bodied voiturette-roadster with a fashionably tapered tail, and designated as the "AS Type A2" and the "AS Type A2S". The 4-cylinder twin overhead camshaft engine was of 1,098 cc capacity and the wheelbase was of just .   Proprietary Chapuis-Dornier or C.I.M.E. engines were also offered. There were brakes on all four wheels. The manufacturer's listed price was 17,000 francs.

Three years later production came to an end with only a few dozen of the little sports cars sold.

References

Bibliography
 Lace, William W. Elizabethan England. San Diego, California: Library of Congress Cataloging-in-Publication Data, 1995. 1–128.

1920s cars
Cars introduced in 1924
Cars of France
Convertibles
Sports cars